Louis-Ernest Barrias was born in Paris into a family of artists. His father was a porcelain-painter, and his brother Félix-Joseph Barrias (1822–1907) was a painter and illustrator. He started as a trainee painter working in the studio of Léon Cogniet but soon turned to sculpture and started to study under Pierre-Jules Cavelier. He entered the studio of François Jouffroy in 1858 as a student at the l'École des Beaux-arts and in 1861 he won second place in that year's Prix de Rome with the composition "Chryséis rendu à son père par Ulysse". In the same year he made his debut at the Paris Salon with his bust of the engraver Jazet. In 1865 he carried off first prize in the Prix de Rome with the work "Fondation de la ville de Marseille" which enabled him to study in Rome. He returned to France when the Franco-Prussian war broke out and enrolled in the Marne National Guard. He was to see active service in the siege of Paris. After the war and until his death, Barrias was in great demand. He received many honours, was made a member of the Institute, and was professor at the l'École des Beaux-arts from 1894 until his death. This listing covers some of his more important works.

Key

Works

Works dismantled and the bronze melted down for armament manufacture

Many of Barrias' bronze sculptures were melted down either directly by the Germans or by order of the Vichy regime during 1941 and 1942. These are listed below.

Funereal works

Barrias executed several sculptures for the decoration of graves.

Note
Article on Barrias and the use of allegory

See also

Pierre-Marie Poisson

Gallery

References

Recommended reading

External links
 Text of complete list of works L-E.BARRIAS (1841–1905) written by Albert Soubies in 1905 and published by Ernest Flammarion. 26 Rue Racine 26.Paris. 
 Text of 1902 book L'Oeuvre de Ernest Barrias with foreword by Georges Lafenestre. Printed by Philippe Renouard, 19, rue des Saints-Pères Paris 
 Archival records of submissions to the Paris Salon
 Phidias - Encyclopédie des sculpteurs français. Comprehensive article on Barrias in French website devoted to sculpture

Lists of works of art